Radon difluoride is a compound of radon, a radioactive noble gas.  Radon reacts readily with fluorine to form a solid compound, but this decomposes on attempted vaporization and its exact composition is uncertain.  Calculations suggest that it may be ionic, unlike all other known binary noble gas compounds. The usefulness of radon compounds is limited because of the radioactivity of radon.  The longest-lived isotope, radon-222, has a half-life of only 3.82 days, which decays by α-emission to yield polonium-218.

Preparation
When radon is heated to 400 °C with fluorine, radon difluoride is formed.

Reactions
Radon difluoride can be reduced to radon and hydrogen fluoride when heated with hydrogen gas at 500 °C.

References

Radon compounds
Fluorides